Kenneth I. Pargament (born November 3, 1950) is an emeritus professor of psychology at Bowling Green State University (Ohio, USA).

Biography 

Born in 1950 in Washington, D.C., Pargament received his Ph.D. from the University of Maryland in 1977. He currently studies various relationships between religion, psychological well-being and stress, as well as other closely related subjects.  He is also licensed in Clinical Psychology and has a private practice.

Pargament has published over 200 papers on the subject of religion and spirituality in psychology.  He is world-renowned for his scholarly contributions to the psychology of religion, and for providing clinically relevant scientific analyses of religion's role in mental health.  Pargament has also written multiple books, including The Psychology of Religion and Coping: Theory, Research, Practice (1997; see article),  and Spiritually Integrated Psychotherapy: Understanding and Addressing the Sacred (2007).  Both of these seminal works provide a systematic program of empirical research, guided by theory, that is of practical relevance to helping professionals.

Research 

One of Pargament's best known areas of research has pertained to Religious Coping, which involves drawing on religious beliefs and practices to understand and deal with life stressors. Pargament has also helped to design a questionnaire called the "RCOPE" to measure Religious Coping strategies.
The three methods of coping that are identified by the RCOPE are the deferring style, self-directing style, and collaborative style. The deferring style involves delegating all problem solving to God; the self-directing style is when the individual chooses to utilize the power God has given them to solve the problem on their own; and the collaborative style is implemented when the individual treats God as a teammate in the problem solving process. The collaborative style of religious coping has been found to have the greatest psychological benefits, correlating with increased self-esteem and lower levels of depression.
Thus, Pargament's work has helped set the stage for a large scale program of research on this subject: currently there have been over 250 published studies on religious coping.

Pargament's research also has helped psychologists learn how religious belief influences mental and physical health. For instance, he found that religious activity increased for Muslim-Americans after 9/11, and that in comparison with those who remained isolated and rejected by their religion, they experienced fewer symptoms of depression  Similarly, he found that negative religious coping among AIDS patients was associated with an increase in HIV-related symptoms 

Pargament has described four major stances toward religion that have been adopted by psychotherapists in their work with clients. He called them the religiously rejectionist, exclusivist, constructivist, and pluralist stances. He claims that the pluralistic approach is the best for clinicians because it recognizes the existence of a Supreme Being but allows for many interpretations of that reality.
Furthermore, Pargament believes that religious discussions should become a greater part of the therapeutic process. He has advocated for religious guidebooks to be created for psychotherapists and that religious training be mandated.

Pargament has also linked attribution theory to the psychology of religion, doing empirical research distinguishing between different forms of religious attribution.

Published books
Authored:
 Kenneth I. Pargament (2007). Spiritually integrated psychotherapy: Understanding and addressing the sacred. New York: Guilford. 
 Kenneth I. Pargament (1997). The psychology of religion and coping: Theory, research, practice (see article). New York: Guilford. 
Edited:
 

 Michael E. McCullough, Kenneth I. Pargament, & Carl E. Thoresen (Eds.) (2000), Forgiveness: Theory, research, and practice. New York: Guilford.

See also 

Multidimensional Measurement of Religiousness/Spirituality (book containing 2 chapters, scales, by Pargament)

References

External links 
 Personal website
 University faculty page
 Publications in UNJobs
 Talk on Youtube by Pargament on Spirituality and Health (17 August 2012, 87 mins)

1950 births
Bowling Green State University faculty
Living people
Psychologists of religion
University of Maryland, College Park alumni
Positive psychologists